Division No. 19 is a census division in Alberta, Canada. It is located in the west-central portion of northern Alberta and surrounds the City of Grande Prairie.

Census subdivisions 
The following census subdivisions (municipalities or municipal equivalents) are located within Alberta's Division No. 19.

Cities
Grande Prairie
Towns
Beaverlodge
Fairview
Falher
Grimshaw
McLennan
Peace River
Sexsmith
Spirit River
Wembley
Villages
Berwyn
Donnelly
Girouxville
Rycroft
Municipal districts
Birch Hills County
Fairview No. 136, M.D. of
Grande Prairie No. 1, County of
Peace No. 135, M.D. of
Saddle Hills County
Smoky River No. 130, M.D. of
Spirit River No. 133, M.D. of
Indian reserves
Duncan's 151A
Horse Lakes 152B

Demographics 

See also 
List of census divisions of Alberta
List of communities in Alberta

References 

Census divisions of Alberta
Peace River Country